Marvin Mitchell (born October 21, 1984) is a former American football linebacker. He was drafted by the New Orleans Saints in the seventh round of the 2007 NFL Draft. He played college football at Tennessee. Mitchell also played for the Miami Dolphins and Minnesota Vikings.

Early years
Mitchell attended Lake Taylor High School in Norfolk, Virginia, where he was an all-district selection on both sides of the ball, playing tight end on offense. He also played basketball, ran track and threw shot put.

Mitchell attended the University of Tennessee, where he played on the school's football team. Though scheduled to redshirt his freshman year, Mitchell played due to injuries to other players. Mitchell missed the 2004 season stemming from an injury suffered while practicing for the Peach Bowl the previous year.

On May 1, 2006, Mitchell was arrested in Knoxville, Tennessee, and charged with disorderly conduct. He was suspended indefinitely from the team, but allowed to return after reaching an agreement with prosecutors.

Professional career

New Orleans Saints
After being drafted in the seventh round of the 2007 draft, Mitchell was signed to a three-year contract on June 18, 2007, and was assigned to the practice squad. Due to an injury to Scott Fujita, Mitchell was brought up from the practice squad and made his NFL debut on October 7, 2007, against the Carolina Panthers.

Miami Dolphins
Mitchell signed with the Miami Dolphins on August 15, 2011.

Minnesota Vikings
Mitchell signed with the Minnesota Vikings on April 10, 2012.

References

External links
New Orleans Saints bio

1984 births
Living people
African-American players of American football
American football linebackers
Miami Dolphins players
Minnesota Vikings players
New Orleans Saints players
Players of American football from Norfolk, Virginia
Tennessee Volunteers football players
21st-century African-American sportspeople
20th-century African-American people